The Bulletin of Insectology is a biannual peer-reviewed open access scientific journal of entomology covering morphology, biology, behaviour and physiology of insects and other arthropods; control of insects, mites, and other arthropod pests with particular reference to biocontrol and integrated pest management.

History
The journal was established in 1928. It was subsequently known under different titles, before obtaining its current title in 2002:
Bollettino del Laboratorio di Entomologia del R. Istituto Superiore Agrario di Bologna – from vol. 1 (1928) to vol. 7 (1934–1935)
Bollettino dell'Istituto di Entomologia della R. Università degli Studi di Bologna – from vol. 8 (1935–1936) to vol. 14 (1942–1943)
Bollettino dell'Istituto di Entomologia della Università degli Studi di Bologna – from vol. 15 (1944–1946) to vol. 37 (1983)
Bollettino dell'Istituto di Entomologia "Guido Grandi" della Università degli Studi di Bologna – from vol. 38 (1984) to vol. 54 (2000)

Abstracting and indexing
The journal is abstracted and indexed in:
Aquatic Sciences and Fisheries Abstracts
Biological Abstracts
BIOSIS Previews
CAB Abstracts
Science Citation Index Expanded
Scopus
The Zoological Record
According to the Journal Citation Reports, the journal has a 2020 impact factor of 1.711.

References

External links

Entomology journals and magazines
Publications established in 1928
Academic journals published by universities and colleges
Biannual journals
English-language journals
University of Bologna